This Is Live, This Is Murderous is a music DVD released by Bleeding Through on June 15, 2004, through Kung Fu Records. The concert footage was recorded in January 2004 at the Glasshouse in Pomona, California. The video has a running time of 50 minutes.

Track listing
"Intro"
"Love Lost in a Hail of Gunfire"
"Revenge I Seek"
"Rise"
"Our Enemies"
"Sweet Vampirous"
"Number Seven With A Bullet"
"Turns Cold To The Touch"
"Murder By Numbers"
"Wake of Orion"
"Savior, Saint, Salvation"
"Insomniac"
"Outro"

For the first minute of the first song being played is studio audio but then becomes live audio from the actual show.

DVD features
Region 0
Keep Case
Full Frame
1.33
Additional Release Material
Audio Commentary
Interactive Features:
Multiple Angles

Bleeding Through video albums
2004 live albums
2004 video albums
Live video albums